Mohamed Kasbr (born 23 July 1974) is an Egyptian former field hockey player. He competed in the men's tournament at the 2004 Summer Olympics.

References

External links
 

1974 births
Living people
Egyptian male field hockey players
Olympic field hockey players of Egypt
Field hockey players at the 2004 Summer Olympics
Place of birth missing (living people)